Dysoneura is an extinct genus of caddisflies, and the type genus of the family Dysoneuridae. The genus lived during the Jurassic period and is found in Russia and Kazakhstan.

Species
The genus contains two species:
 †Dysoneura trifurcata Sukatsheva, 1968 – Kazakhstan
 †Dysoneura zherikhini Sukatsheva & Vassilenko, 2013 – Russia

References

Jurassic insects
†
†
Prehistoric insect genera
Jurassic insects of Asia
Fossils of Kazakhstan
Fossils of Russia